The Samsung SGH-D807 is a mobile phone manufactured by Samsung Electronics. It is the third model in the Samsung's mobile phone 'D' series

Features and specifications
Still camera features:
 1.3-megapixel
 Images stored as JPEG
 Toggle to video mode by pressing the "1" key
 Resolutions: 1280x1024, 1152x864, 800x600, 640x480, 320x240, and 176x144 ("2" key)
 Quality settings: Economy, Normal, Fine, and Super Fine ("3" key)
 Multi-shot options: 6, 9, or 15 Shots (Normal or High quality); 2x2 or 3x3 mosaic (Auto or Manual Control) ("4" key)
 Real-time photo effects (filters): grayscale, negative, sepia, emboss, sketch, antique, and moonlight ("5" key)
 Picture frame effect ("7" key)
 Self-timer: 3, 5 and 10 seconds ("8" key)
 Viewfinder: Standard Ratio or Full Screen ("*" key)
 Brightness can be adjusted (up/down on the directional pad)
 Digital zoom (up to 4x) can be adjusted (left/right on the directional pad)
 Vertical/Horizontal Flip (volume up/down keys)

Java (programming language):
 Microedition Platform: Java ME
 Microedition Configuration: CLDC 1.1
 Microedition Profile: MIDP 2.0

Headset:
 Samsung part number for the headset is AEP420SBE.

Supported file formats

 Images: JPEG, GIF, AGIF, WBMP, Bitmap (BMP), and PNG
 Animated GIFs are not supported as wallpaper images.
 Video: 3GP (AMR Audio Only)
 Neither photos nor videos can be viewed full screen, drastically cutting into the screen real estate.
 Audio: iMelody, SMAF, MIDI, SP-MIDI, MP3 (<=192kbit/s), Advanced Audio Coding (AAC)
 These formats can be used as custom ring tones, but there is no option to customize other tones (e.g. text messaging, voicemail, etc.)
 All filenames (including the extension) must be 32 characters or less.
 File size limits:
 Wallpaper: 100 KB
 Ringtone: 600 KB

Convenience features
 The phone's external keys can be set to lock when the user slides the phone shut.
 The voice dialing does not require setting up 'voice tags' for callers.
 Ringtone volume can be controlled with the side volume buttons and muted/unmuted by holding the # key.

References

External links
 Samsung D807 Tips, Tricks, and How-To Guide Java, unlocking, backgrounds and more
 Samsung Specification Page
 Samsung FAQ
Samsung SGH-D807 Product Manual (.pdf file)
 Download the latest PC Studio Synchronize contacts and files with a PC using a proprietary USB cable or Bluetooth.
 AT&T/Cingular Forums - Samsung Excellent resource for AT&T/Cingular users
 Howard Forums - Samsung Likely the highest traffic Samsung phone forum

D807
Mobile phones introduced in 2006